Jeswald Salacuse is an American lawyer, currently the Henry J. Braker Professor at Fletcher School of Law and Diplomacy, Tufts University, and also the school's former Dean. He is featured in Who's Who in America, Who's Who in the East and Who's Who in American Law, was a Distinguished Professorial Fellow at Queen Mary University of London from 1995-2003 and was awarded the Fulbright Distinguished Chair in Comparative Law at University of Trento in 2000. He also served as the Chairman of the Institute for Transnational Arbitration.

References

Year of birth missing (living people)
Living people
Tufts University faculty
American lawyers
Harvard Law School alumni